Southwest Virginia Holiness Association Camp Meeting, also known as the Salem Camp Meeting, is a historic camp meeting complex located at Salem, Virginia. The complex consists of two buildings—a 1922 tabernacle and a dormitory, built about 1926.  Both buildings are plainly detailed frame buildings with novelty weatherboard siding and poured concrete basement levels.  The tabernacle measures approximately 60 feet by 80 feet and contains an auditorium designed for a capacity of 2,000 people.  The dormitory is a two-story, three bay, building with a full-width one-story porch.

The church was added to the National Register of Historic Places in 1996.

References

Properties of religious function on the National Register of Historic Places in Virginia
Religious buildings and structures completed in 1922
Houses completed in 1926
Buildings and structures in Salem, Virginia
National Register of Historic Places in Salem, Virginia
Camp meeting grounds
Holiness movement